Bhuva is a surname. Notable people with the surname include:

Chahhyaben Bhuva, Indian politician
Mansukh Bhuva, Indian politician

Indian surnames